Shamsun Nahar Begum is a Bangladesh Awami League politician, lawyer and a former Member of Parliament from a reserved seat.

Early life and education
Begum was born into a Bengali Muslim family in the village of Ujanigaon in Sunamganj. She completed her education until university, becoming a Bachelor of Arts and Bachelor of Laws.

Career
After completing her education, Begum became a qualified lawyer. She participated in the 2014 Bangladeshi general elections as an Awami League candidate and successfully won a reserved seat in the 10th Jatiya Sangsad.

References

Awami League politicians
Living people
Women members of the Jatiya Sangsad
10th Jatiya Sangsad members
21st-century Bangladeshi women politicians
21st-century Bangladeshi politicians
Year of birth missing (living people)
People from Dakshin Sunamganj Upazila